Ochyrotica bjoernstadti is a moth of the family Pterophoroidea. It is found in Tanzania.

The wingspan is about 16 mm. The moth flies in May.

External links
Ten new species of Afrotropical Pterophoridae (Lepidoptera)

Endemic fauna of Tanzania
Ochyroticinae
Insects of Tanzania
Moths of Africa
Taxa named by Cees Gielis
Moths described in 2008